John Selkirk (1782 – 1843) was a Tyneside songwriter of the 18th and 19th century. His best known works are those about Bob Cranky and the Swalwell Hopping.

Early life 
John Selkirk was born in 1782 in Gateshead (just o’er the blue stane o' the brig), The son of George Selkirk, a local barber who had a shop in The Close, Newcastle.
John joined Messrs Strake and Boyd of The Quayside, Newcastle upon Tyne as a clerk.
His songs turn up on "The Northern Minstrel or Gateshead Songster 1806-07".
He has been described as "The Otway of the local muse".

Later life 
He did at one stage move to London in attempt to find success as a merchant but this eluded him, and he returned to his native Tyneside in 1830, a failure and destitute.
His final years were lived in poverty and misery.
He sadly fell into the River Tyne at or near Sandgate and drowned when aged 60/61. The report of the inquest in the Newcastle Chronicle 18 November 1843 stated ""....on the body of John Selkirk aged 60 who fell into the river near Sandgate on Saturday evening, and was drowned.  The deceased was a person of singular habits and disposition, and had formerly been a respectable merchant in London; but latterly was so reduced in circumstances as to subsist upon the charity of the benevolent.  For some time in the past he had slept nights on the shavings of a joiner's shop in Sandgate, and refused to accept parochial relief. On Saturday evening he was observed to carry a tin bottle to the river to obtain water, when he unfortunately fell in....". 
He was buried on 14 November 1843 in Ballast Hills burial-ground (plot Number 655).

Works 

The main character he seemed to write about was Bob Cranky, a habitual braggart, and written in his 20s.

This material includes :-

Bob Cranky's 'Size Sunday ('Size being an abbreviation for Assize) (1804)
Bob Cranky's Complaint and
Swalwell Hopping to the tune of Irish air "Paddy's Wedding" (1807).

See also 
 Geordie dialect words

References

External links
 John Selkirk 1782–1843
 John Selkirk
 Swalwell

English male poets
English songwriters
People from Newcastle upon Tyne (district)
Musicians from Tyne and Wear
1843 deaths
1782 births
19th-century English musicians